Maturity or immaturity may refer to:

 Adulthood or age of majority
 Maturity model
 Capability Maturity Model, in software engineering, a model representing the degree of formality and optimization of processes in an organization
 Developmental age, the age of an embryo as measured from the point of fertilization
 Mature technology, a technology has been in use and development for long enough that most of its initial problems have been overcome
 Maturity (finance), indicating the final date for payment of principal and interest
 Maturity (geology), rock, source rock, and hydrocarbon generation
 Maturity (psychological), the attainment of one's final level of psychological functioning and the integration of their personality into an organized whole
 Maturity (sedimentology), the proximity of a sedimentary deposit from its source
 Sexual maturity, the stage when an organism can reproduce, though this is distinct from adulthood

See also
 Evolution
 Maturation (disambiguation)
 Mature (disambiguation)